Flavius Hierius (floruit 425–432) was a politician of the Eastern Roman Empire.

Life 

Hierius was Praetorian prefect of the East a first time from 425 to 428, then a second time in 432. In 427, he also held the consulate, with Ardabur as a colleague, both chosen by the Eastern court. In 427 he also restored and dedicated the Baths of Constantine (also called "of Theodosius").

Sources 
 Jones, Arnold Hugh Martin, John Robert Martindale, John Morris, "Hierius 2", Prosopography of the Later Roman Empire, Volume 2, Cambridge University Press, 1980, p. 557.

5th-century Byzantine people
5th-century Roman consuls
Imperial Roman consuls
Praetorian prefects of the East